This article lists the tennis players who have won the most tour-level professional tournament titles since the Open Era began in 1968. Titles can be any combination of singles and doubles, so the combined total is the default sorting of the lists. The current top-level events are on the ATP Tour for men and the WTA Tour for women.

Overall titles (Open Era)

 Correct as of 8 January 2023.

Singles titles

Men

Open Era title leaders composition

 Correct as of 29 January 2023.
Sources: ATP; Michel Sutter, Vainqueurs Winners 1946–2003, Paris 2003; Joe McCauley, The History of Professional Tennis, London 2001; Robert Geist, Der Grösste Meister Die denkwürdige Karriere des australischen Tennisspielers Kenneth Robert Rosewall, Vienna 1999; Tony Trabert in "Tennis de France" magazine; ATP; John Barrett editor, World of Tennis Yearbooks, London 1969 to 1983.

Before 1972 tennis results were not automatically registered as they are now with the ITF (International Tennis Federation) and the ATP. Many have been lost or never even recorded. In particular, many professional results before 1968 have disappeared or are contradictory (for instance Ray Bowers, who gives a very detailed account of the 1926–1945 pro era called "History of the Pro Tennis Wars" in the "Tennis Server" Web site, categorically affirms that there was no 1936 Wembley Pro tournament (and no 1938 edition too) while McCauley lists a final result). However the most important ones have been preserved. ATP data is far from being exhaustive. They only begin in 1968 and they omit many results until 1971–1972 and even after. For example, there are no results of the New South Wales Championships in 1973 (Mal Anderson) or in 1974 (Tony Roche).

Therefore, the global numbers listed here are at least equal if not superior to those of the ATP (even the modern players as Connors, Lendl, McEnroe, Nastase, Ashe or Borg have more titles here (for instance Borg won his first tournament at Helsinki in 1973 and it doesn't appear in the ATP statistics)). Other remark: Michel Sutter chose about 150–200 tournaments each year including some invitation tournaments or tournaments which were at the time (before the nineties) the equivalent of the Challenger series tournaments of today. When those tournaments appeared in the early nineties Sutter listed them in his book. Sutter, being the main source of that part of the article, such tournaments are counted in this list (this explains for instance why Federer has four more wins than his ATP wins number).

Women

 Correct as of 1 September 2022.

Gallery

See also
 Open Era tennis records – Men's singles
 Open Era tennis records – Women's singles
 Chronological list of men's Grand Slam tennis champions
 Chronological list of women's Grand Slam tennis champions
 List of ATP Tour top-level tournament singles champions
 Top-level tournament statistics

Notes

References

p